Tong Le (born 29 April 1993) is a Chinese footballer who plays as a midfielder.

Career statistics

Club

Notes

References

1993 births
Living people
Chinese footballers
Chinese expatriate footballers
Association football midfielders
Primeira Liga players
Beijing Guoan F.C. players
C.D. Aves players
Chinese expatriate sportspeople in Portugal
Expatriate footballers in Portugal
Sportspeople from Nanjing